Shurbazar is a market town in eastern Uzbekistan, Central Asia. It is in southern Qashqadaryo Region.

References

External links
 "Shurbazar, Uzbekistan", Falling Rain Genomics, Inc.
 "Shurbazar Map — Satellite Images of Amandara", Maplandia

Populated places in Qashqadaryo Region